Succinate dehydrogenase complex assembly factor 2, formerly known as SDH5 and also known as SDH assembly factor 2 or SDHAF2 is a protein that in humans is encoded by the SDHAF2 gene. This gene encodes a mitochondrial protein needed for the flavination of a succinate dehydrogenase complex subunit required for activity of the complex. Mutations in this gene are associated with  pheochromocytoma and paraganglioma.

Structure 
SDHAF2 is located on the q arm of Chromosome 11 in position 12.2 and spans 16,642 base pairs. The SDHAF2 gene produces a 6.7 kDa protein composed of 65 amino acids. This highly conserved protein is a cofactor of flavin adenine dinucleotide (FAD). The structure represents a five-helix bundle with a region of well-defined conserved surface residues. This conserved region includes a negatively charged periphery and a positively charged surface, and a patch that is hydrophobic. The region is located in α-helices I, II, and the connecting band.

Function 

The SDHAF2 gene encodes a mitochondrial protein associated with the  succinate dehydrogenase (SDH) complex (mitochondrial complex II) in the mitochondrial respiratory chain, which plays essential roles in both the electron transport chain and the Krebs(tricarboxylic acid) cycle. SDHAF2 is integral in the proper function of the SDH complex, mainly in SDH-dependent respiration, and interacts with the catalytic subunit of the complex. SDHAF2 participates in the flavination of SDH1(SDHA), another subunit of the SDH complex. It does so by incorporating the flavin adenine dinucleotide (FAD) cofactor into SDHA. Such flavination is required for a fully functional SDH complex. Knockdown of SDHAF2 leads to the loss-of-function of the SDH complex, a decrease in the enzyme complex stability, and a substantial reduction in all subunits. SDHAF2 was also found to function as a tumor suppressor.

Clinical significance 
SDHAF2 is a tumor suppressor gene. Constitutional mutations in this gene cause hereditary paraganglioma, a neuroendocrine tumor formerly known to be linked to SDH subunit mutations. paraganglioma is a neural crest tumor usually derived from the chemoreceptor tissue of a paraganglion, and may develop at various body sites, including the head, neck, thorax and abdomen. Most commonly, they are located in the head and neck region, specifically at the carotid bifurcation, the jugular foramen, the vagus nerve, and in the middle ear. Phenotypes include excessive catecholamine induced hypertension, dysfunction of major blood vessels and cranial nerves, significant morbidity, sweating, and palpitations. In cases of extra-adrenal localization, the tumor may turn metastatic and aggressive. Loss of SDH complex function has been known to be responsible for paraganglioma. Mutations in this gene are found in the DNA of only a small fraction of patients with the disease.

Interactions 
SDHAF2 interacts with SDHA within the SDH catalytic dimer. In addition to SDHA, SDHAF2 has 17 protein-protein interactions, including interactions with proteins such as IMMT, SUCLG2, UBINEDDSUMO1, SSX2IP, and others.

References

Further reading 

 
 
 
 

Genes
Human proteins